The L'Ardennais was a French automobile manufactured in Rethel (Ardennes) from 1901 to around 1903.  The voiturette featured interchangeable water- and air-cooled cylinders for summer or winter use.

Ardennais, L'